Petkim Petrokimya Holding A.Ş. is the leading petrochemical company of Turkey. Founded on April 3, 1965, the main plant complex is located in Yarımca, Izmit. From 1985 on a second complex has been constructed in Aliağa, İzmir.

Specializing in petrochemical manufacturing, the company produces ethylene, polyethylene, polyvinyl chloride, polypropylene and other chemical building blocks for use in the manufacture of plastics, textiles, and other consumer and industrial products. The company has 14 manufacturing plants supplying a significant portion of petrochemicals used in Turkey. The company also exports products to the United States, and countries in Europe, the Middle East, Africa, and Asia.

Petkim is listed on the Istanbul Stock Exchange.

Petlim is a container port currently being built near the town of Aliağa.

References

External links
Petkim Aliağa Port

Chemical companies of Turkey
Petrochemical companies
Companies based in İzmir
Chemical companies established in 1965
Non-renewable resource companies established in 1965
Companies listed on the Istanbul Stock Exchange
Turkish brands
Turkish companies established in 1965